

Date
In Hungary, date is traditionally expressed in big-endian form, like ISO 8601. Numeric date elements are followed by a dot. The format yyyy. month d. is commonly used, the name of the month can be abbreviated (standard are ‘’, ‘’, ‘’, ‘’, ‘’, ‘’, ‘’, ‘’, ‘’, ‘’, ‘’, ‘’).  Months can also be written using Roman or Arabic numerals. Examples:

As year and day elements in Hungarian are ordinal numbers, they are followed by a dot. However, unless a suffix is added, they are said as cardinal numbers.  Also note that stacking of symbols when writing in Hungarian is considered a bad practice, therefore when a suffix is attached to the date using a hyphen, the dot is omitted.

 (on August 1, 1999)

A single year is followed by a dot unless it is

 followed with a suffix ‘’ (in 1999)
 the object of the sentence ‘’ (1999 was a nice year.)
 followed with a postposition ‘’ (after 1999)
 a genitive ‘’ (winter of 1999)
 in parentheses ‘’ (the year of his/her birth (1999)…)

The dot can also be omitted in other cases such as memorials or book covers.

Monday is the first day of the week.

Time 
Like in most countries, the 24-hour clock is used in formal or informal and 12-hour clock in informal. The time format is "hh  mm ", but the numeric form hh.mm or hh:mm can also be used. Example:

10.35 or 10:35

The following are commonly accepted divisions of the day that can be said before the time:

 (dawn) – 1–5 a.m.
 (morning) – 6–9 a.m.
 (before noon) – 10–11 a.m.
 (afternoon) – 1–5 p.m.
 (evening) – 6–10 p.m.
 (night) – 11 p.m.-1 a.m.

Each hour is divided into four equal periods and are verbally referred to as in the following examples:

 (quarter 8) – 7:15
 (half 8) – 7:30
 (three-quarter 8) – 7:45

Example:

 – 7:40
 – 7:03

References 

Time in Hungary
Hungary